Asher (titled Hitman: Redemption in the UK) is a 2018 American action thriller film directed by Michael Caton-Jones and starring Ron Perlman in the title role. It was written by Jay Zaretsky.

Premise
Asher is an Israeli former Mossad agent turned gun-for-hire, living an austere life in an ever-changing Brooklyn. Approaching the end of his career, he breaks the oath he took as a young man when he meets Sophie on a hit gone wrong. In order to have love in his life before it is too late, he must kill the man he was, for a chance at becoming the man he wants to be.

Cast
 Ron Perlman as Asher
 Famke Janssen as Sophie
 Peter Facinelli as Uziel
 Marta Milans as Marina
 Richard Dreyfuss as Avi
 Jacqueline Bisset as Dora
 Ned Eisenberg as Abram
 Guy Burnet as Lyor
 William Perry as Black Fella
 Blake Perlman as Hannah
 Joseph Siprut as Craig
 Bobby Daniel Rodriguez as Latin Man
 Charles DelGatto as Bodega Clerk

Production
Filming began in the Syracuse, New York, area in August 2017.

Reception

Box office
The film grossed $2,846 with home DVD sales plus $1,290 home Blu-Ray sales for a total of $4,145 domestic video sales.

Critical response
On Metacritic, the film has a weighted average score of 58 out of 100, based on 6 critics, indicating "mixed or average reviews".

References

External links
 
 

2018 films
American action thriller films
American action drama films
Films set in the 21st century
Films shot in New York (state)
2018 action drama films
2018 crime action films
2010s English-language films
2010s American films